Justin Va'a (born on 26 July 1978 Wainuiomata, New Zealand) is a former prop for the Samoan national rugby team and the Scottish club Glasgow Warriors in the Celtic League.

He has earned 9 caps for Samoa. He was a member of the Pacific Islanders rugby union team for the 2006 tour of Europe.

In 2012 he played his 100th game for Wainuiomata.

References

External links
Glasgow profile

Samoan rugby union players
1978 births
Living people
Rugby union players from Lower Hutt
New Zealand sportspeople of Samoan descent
Samoa international rugby union players
Pacific Islanders rugby union players
Samoan expatriate rugby union players
Expatriate rugby union players in Scotland
Samoan expatriate sportspeople in Scotland
Glasgow Warriors players
Rugby union props